Giro della Provincia di Grosseto is a three-day cycling race in the Province of Grosseto, Italy. The stage race was established in 2008 as a 2.1 event on the UCI Europe Tour. In 2008, the second stage had to be annulled following protests by riders of the unsafe nature of the course finale. The inaugural event was won by Italian Filippo Pozzato of the Liquigas team.

Past winners

References

External links

2008 results from cyclingwebsite.net

UCI Europe Tour races
Cycle races in Italy
Recurring sporting events established in 2008
2008 establishments in Italy